Eupithecia calderae is a moth in the  family Geometridae. It is found in Equatorial Guinea.

References

 , 1999: New Geometridae from Bioko Island, Equatorial Guinea (Lepidoptera, Geometridae). Nouvelle Revue d'Entomologie 16 (2): 147-153.

Moths described in 1999
calderae
Moths of Africa